The 2011 African Youth Championship was a football tournament for the Under-20 level national teams in Africa. It was due to be held in Libya from 18 March to 1 April. Following political unrest in the region, CAF decided to postpone the tournament, before deciding that South Africa would be the new hosts, with games taking place between 17 April and 2 May.

As the Championship also acted as a qualifier for the 2011 FIFA U-20 World Cup, the tournament would have to be played before the end of June 2011.

The tournament was won by Nigeria, who beat Cameroon in the final, to win their sixth title.

Qualification

Qualified teams:
  (hosts, replaces )

Squads

Venues

Johannesburg has been named as venue of Orange African Youth Championship 2011. Matches was played at two stadiums in Johannesburg. Dobsonville Stadium, home of Moroka Swallows and Bidvest Stadium, home of Wits University. Rand Stadium, was originally selected as a host stadium, but was dropped in favour of Bidvest Stadium.

Officials
The following referees were chosen for the tournament.

Referees

Daniel Volgraaff (South Africa)
Adam Cordier (Chad)
Badara Diatta (Senegal)
Crespin Aguidissou (Benin)
Eldin Abdel Gadir Badr (Sudan)
Hamdi Chaaban (Egypt)
Mohamed Benouza (Algeria)
Mario Bangoura Aboubacar (Guinea)

Assistant referees

Thusi Siwela Zakhele (South Africa)
Mohamed Benarous (Algeria)
Sunguifolo Yeo (Ivory Coast)
Malonga Bouende (Congo)
John Kanyenye Lonngional (Tanzania)
Berhe Tesfagiorgis (Eritrea)
Malick Alidu Salifu (Ghana)
Fousseyni Traore (Mali)

Final tournament

Group stage

Group A

Group B

Knockout stage

The teams that reached this phase qualified for the 2011 FIFA U-20 World Cup.

Semifinals

Third place playoff

Final

Winners

Player Awards

Top goalscorer:  Uche Nwofor
Fair player of the tournament:  Ahmed El Shenawy
Player of the tournament:  Edgar Salli

Goal scorers

4 goals
 Uche Nwofor

3 goals
 Lucky Nguzana

2 goals

 Frank Ohandza
 Edgar Salli
 Mohamed Hamdy
 Richmond Boakye
 Kalifa Coulibaly
 Olarenwaju Kayode

1 goal

 Emmanuel Mbongo
 Ahmed Hegazy
 Mohamed Salah
 Baboucarr Jammeh
 Kwame Chana
 Litsepe Leonty Marabe
 Amara Konaté
 Cheick Mohamed Chérif Doumbia
 Ibrahim Diallo
 Terry Envoh
 Azeez Ramon Olamilekan
 Stanley Okoro
 Letsie Koapeng

References

External links
African U-20 Championship 2011 – rsssf.com
2011 African U-20 Championship – cafonline
CAF U-20 Championship at Soccerway

 
Africa U-20 Cup of Nations
Youth
2011
African Youth Championship
2011 in youth association football